Code Red is an album led by drummer Cindy Blackman which was recorded in 1990 and released on the Muse label in 1992.

Reception

Ted Panken, writing for The Rolling Stone Jazz & Blues Album Guide, called Code Red "a rhythmic tour de force," and stated that it "elicits some of the most powerful performances on record up to that time" from the musicians. He concluded: "Code Red recodes [Tony] Williams the Milesian and '80s group leader to remarkable effect. This one is delightful over repeated listenings."

Track listing 
All compositions by Cindy Blackman except where noted
 "Code Red" – 6:53
 "Anxiety" – 5:19
 "Next Time Forever" – 6:34
 "Something for Art (Drum Solo)" – 6:35
 "'Round Midnight" (Thelonious Monk, Cootie Williams Bernie Hanighen) – 9:05
 "Circles" – 5:31
 "Face in the Dark" – 6:13
 "Green" – 5:30

Personnel 
Cindy Blackman - drums
Wallace Roney - trumpet (tracks 1-3 & 5-8)
Steve Coleman - alto saxophone (tracks 1-3 & 5-8)
Kenny Barron - piano (tracks 1-3 & 5-8)
Lonnie Plaxico - bass (tracks 1-3 & 5-8)

References 

Cindy Blackman albums
1992 albums
Muse Records albums
Albums recorded at Van Gelder Studio